Ilnur Tufikovich Alshin (born 31 August 1993) is a Russian professional football player. He plays for FC Fakel Voronezh.

Club career
He made his Russian Premier League debut for FC Tosno on 22 July 2017 in a game against FC Krasnodar.

He played in the 2017–18 Russian Cup final for FC Avangard Kursk on 9 May 2018 in the Volgograd Arena against the 2–1 winners, his parent club FC Tosno.

On 29 June 2022, Alshin returned to FC Fakel Voronezh.

Career statistics

References

External links
 
 

1993 births
People from Tyumen
Living people
Russian footballers
Association football midfielders
Russia youth international footballers
Russian Premier League players
Russian First League players
Russian Second League players
FC Spartak Moscow players
FC Fakel Voronezh players
FC Tosno players
FC Avangard Kursk players
FC Tambov players
FC Baltika Kaliningrad players
Sportspeople from Tyumen Oblast